The Crown Prince Frederick Range is a large mountain range in King Christian IX Land, eastern Greenland. Administratively this range is part of the Sermersooq Municipality.

Despite being relatively unknown it has some of the highest summits in Greenland.

History
The Crown Prince Frederick Range was first surveyed by Sir Martin Lindsay in 1934 during the British Trans-Greenland Expedition and was named after the Crown Prince Frederick of Denmark (1899 – 1972) who would be crowned King Frederick IX in 1947. The expedition crossed Greenland from west to east, and succeeded in fixing the positions of many other important features further to the northeast, including Gunnbjørnsfjeld —the highest point in Greenland. On the return journey the team headed south-west to Amassalik and on their journey discovered the extent of the Crown Prince Frederick Range. Lindsay's expedition set a new world record after travelling  on sleds, 700 of which were through hitherto unexplored territory.

Following Martin Lindsay's pioneering venture few expeditions visited the range which remained almost consigned to oblivion for many decades. Finally in 1995 the first guided icecap journey through the range was organized and the following year, in July and August 1996, a number of the main summits of the range were climbed for the first time by members of the Tangent British East Greenland Expedition, including Paul Walker.

Geography
The Crown Prince Frederick Range  is a group of nunataks scattered over a vast region between the Greenland Ice Sheet and the coast. The range is located to the northeast of Mont Forel and southwest of Kangerlussuaq Fjord.
The level expanses between the nunatak clusters of the range are usually very wide and permanently covered with ice and snow.

The region of the Crown Prince Frederick Mountains is uninhabited, the nearest settlement being Tasiilaq, located about 175 km to the SSW of the southern end of the range.

Subranges
Panorama Nunatak and Redkammen are two large nunataks at the northeastern end. They are located to the southwest and to the southeast of the Hutchinson Plateau respectively and are sometimes included as part of the Crown Prince Frederick Range.

Mountains
Owing to its remote location this large range has been somewhat neglected by mountaineers though, despite some impressive peaks of good granite. 

 Peak (3,256 m) and highest point at 
 Peak (3,153 m) at 
 Peak (3,092 m) at 
 Peak (3,088 m) at 
 Peak (3,075 m) at 
 Peak (3,056 m) at 
 Peak (3,021 m) at 
 Peak (2,996 m) at 
 Peak (2,995 m) at 
 Peak (2,990 m) at 
 Peak (2,961 m) at 
 Peak (2,948 m) at 
 Peak (2,945 m) at 
 Peak (2,904 m) at 
 Peak (2,897 m) at 
 Peak (2,891 m) at 
 Peak near TBEGE base camp (2,882 m) at 
 Peak (2,830 m) at 
 Peak (2,824 m) at 
 Peak (2,777 m) at 
 Peak (2,542 m) at 
 Peak (2,691 m) at 
 Peak (2,473 m) at 
 Peak (2,465 m) at 
 Peak (2,446 m) at 
 Anniversary Peak (2,440 m)
 Peak (2,425 m) at 
 Peak (2,370 m) at 
 Peak (2,093 m) at 
 Peak (1,831 m) at

Climate
From the north and from the west the range is fully exposed to the influence of the Greenland Ice Sheet. As there is no barrier to the shrieking cold winds of the icy expanse, ice cap climate prevails in the region.

The average annual temperature in the area of the Crown Prince Frederick Range is -14 °C. The warmest month is July when the average temperature reaches -2 °C and the coldest is March when the temperature sinks to -20 °C.

See also
List of mountain ranges of Greenland
List of mountains in Greenland
 List of Nunataks of Greenland

Further reading

References

External links
Picture of Kronprins Frederik Bjerge Area
Status of the endangered ivory gull, Pagophila eburnea, in Greenland

Mountain ranges of Greenland
Nunataks of Greenland
Sermersooq